Abendanon is a Jewish surname, a variant of Abendana. People with this surname include:

 Nick Abendanon (born 1986), English rugby union footballer
 Maryse Abendanon (born 1966), Dutch field hockey player
 Jacques Henry Abendanon (1852–1925), Minister of Culture, Religion, and Crafts in the Dutch East Indies from 1900 to 1905